SC Waterloo Region is a professional Canadian soccer team that plays in the Canadian Soccer League, a non-FIFA-sanctioned league. The club was formed in 2011 under the name KW United FC and competed in the Second Division of the CSL. The following year the organization's name was changed to SC Waterloo Region and was promoted to the First Division. Within a short time Waterloo enjoyed a string of success within the league. Their biggest achievement came in the 2013 season by winning the CSL Championship, and reaching the championship match finals once more in 2015 only to lose to Toronto Croatia. In 2016, the organization voluntarily relegated itself to the CSL Second Division.

History  
In 2011, professional soccer returned to the Kitchener-Waterloo region since 1991 when the Kitchener Kickers competed in the original Canadian Soccer League. The team owners Tony Kocis and Vojislav Brisevac served as the club president, team manager, and secured a deal with Jako to sponsor the club. The club was named Kitchener-Waterloo United FC and began play in the Canadian Soccer League Second Division. The team's original venue was located at Budd Park. In their debut season, United finished fourth in their division and secured a postseason berth. At the conclusion of the season Ryan Pumier received the Goalkeeper of the Year award.

The following season the club was renamed SC Waterloo Region in order to strengthen ties with youth club Waterloo Minor Soccer Club, and was promoted to the CSL First Division. Their home venue was moved to University Stadium, and part owner Lazo Džepina with coaching credentials from Europe and the CSL assumed head coach responsibilities. Džepina's recruitment of players consisted primarily from the Yugoslavian countries players like Adis Hasecic, Nemanja Simeunovic, Vladimir Zelenbaba, Drazen Vukovic, Dado Hadrovic, and Haris Fazlagic was selected as team captain. Waterloo made their First Division debut on May 6, 2012 against Windsor Stars in a 2-0 victory with both goals coming from Hadrovic. In their inaugural season, the club finished ninth in the overall standings, and missed the final postseason berth by two points. At the CSL awards banquet Vukovic received the CSL Golden Boot for finishing as the league's top goalscorer with 20 goals. 

In preparations for the 2013 season, Džepina acquired the services of Ranko Golijanin, and Predrag Papaz while retaining the majority of core veterans from the previous season. Meanwhile, Waterloo transferred their home venue to Warrior Field , and Vukovic was awarded the team captaincy. The team performed well during the regular season even achieving an eight-game undefeated streak at home. SC Waterloo managed to secure a postseason berth by finishing fifth in the overall standings with the second highest goal scoring record, and fourth best defensive record. In the first round of the postseason, their opponents were Brampton City United FC, where Waterloo advanced to the next round after thrashing Brampton 4-0 with goals coming from Fazlagic, Hasecic, Vukovic, and Zoran Kukic. The club faced Toronto Croatia in the semi-finals where the match concluded in a 1-1 draw which resulted in a penalty shootout with Waterloo winning the shootout by a score of 5-4. Their opponents in the CSL Championship final were regular season champions Kingston FC, where Waterloo claimed their first piece of silverware by defeating Kingston by a score of 3-1 with goals coming from Zelenbaba and Fazlagic. At the same time, the club's reserve team SC Waterloo B won the CSL Second Division championship defeating Toronto Croatia B by a score of 2-0 with goals from Erwin Uzunovic, and Mohammed-Ali Heydarpour.

For the 2014 season, Aleksandar Stojiljković, Ramon Bailey, and Kiril Dimitrov were brought in as reinforcements. Throughout the season, Waterloo's performance paled in comparison from their previous season, but still managed to clinch a playoff berth by finishing seventh in the overall standings. Their opponents in the first round were Toronto Croatia, where unfortunately Waterloo failed to defend their championship after suffering a 4-2 loss. In the Second Division, Waterloo reached the finals where they were defeated by Kingston FC. At the conclusion of the season, Stojiljkovic and Nikola Miokovic were awarded the Rookie of the Year award for the First & Second Divisions.

Their performance in the 2015 season improved as they finished fourth in the overall standings, and recording the third best defensive record. In the first round of the playoffs, Waterloo faced Toronto Atomic FC, and advanced to the next round by a score of 2-0 with goals coming from Hasecic and Slobodan Milanovic. In the semi-finals, the opponents were regular season champions the Serbian White Eagles, whom they managed to upset by a score of 3-2 with goals from Mladen Zeljkovic, Ali Heydarpour, and Hasecic. For the second time in the club's history, they reached the CSL Championship final where they faced Toronto Croatia. Unfortunately the match didn't end in their favor as Toronto managed to secure a goal in a 1-0 victory. The reserve team managed to create a milestone by reaching the championship finals for third straight year. Their opponents were Milton SC, but came short as their senior squad after suffering a 3-1 loss. Despite Waterloo's infield success, the club was without controversy as there was one reported allegation of match-fixing in a match against Niagara United. Waterloo officials responded by denying any involvement in trying to manipulate the outcome of the match against Niagara .

In 2016, SC Waterloo voluntarily were relegated to the CSL Second Division. Since their return to the Second Division, the Tri-City club secured the regular season title. Their opponents in the postseason were the York Region Shooters B, where they were eliminated from the competition by a score of 1-0. For the 2017 season, the club was promoted to the First Division.

Roster

Notable players
  Emilio Estevez

Honours
CSL Championship:  2013
CSL II Championship: 2013
Canadian Soccer League Second Division: 2016

Head coaches

Seasons

Old logo

References

External links
 

 
Canadian Soccer League (1998–present) teams
Association football clubs established in 2011
Soccer clubs in Ontario
2011 establishments in Ontario
Sport in Waterloo, Ontario
Sport in the Regional Municipality of Waterloo